Károly Lajthay (7 December 1883 – 30 August 1946) was a Hungarian film director, actor and screenwriter. He directed 17 films between 1918 and 1944. He also appeared in 13 films between 1916 and 1920. He was born in Marosvásárhely, Austria-Hungary (now Târgu Mureş, Romania). He directed the first film version of Dracula entitled Drakula halála (1921). Lajthay died in Budapest, Hungary.

Selected filmography
 A Karthausi (1916) — As actor
 A Senki fia (1917) — As actor
 Harrison and Barrison (1917) — As actor
 St. Peter's Umbrella (1917) — As actor
 Nászdal (1917) — As actor
 Drakula halála (1921) — As director, lost film

References

External links

1883 births
1946 deaths
Hungarian film directors
Hungarian male film actors
Hungarian male silent film actors
Hungarian male writers
Male screenwriters
20th-century Hungarian screenwriters
20th-century Hungarian male actors